The Tulsi Samman is an arts award presented annually by the government of Madhya Pradesh state in India. The award is named after Tulsi Das, an Indian saint, poet and philosopher, best known as the author of Ramacharitamanas, an epic devoted to Lord Rama. This award is presented for outstanding achievement in one of the four categories of the tribal, traditional and folk arts. These categories are: art, theatre, dance and music.

Recipients
The recipients of the Tulsi Samman include:

Notes

2008–09 rangaswami vedar

See also
Kalidas Samman

Performing arts awards
Indian art awards
Government of Madhya Pradesh
1983 establishments in Madhya Pradesh
Awards established in 1983